1980 saw the release of a number of games with influential concepts, including Pac-Man, Battlezone, Crazy Climber, Mystery House, Missile Command, Phoenix, Rally-X, Space Panic, Stratovox, Zork, Adventure, and Olympic Decathlon. The year's highest-grossing video game was Namco's arcade game Pac-Man, while the best-selling home system was Nintendo's Game & Watch. The Atari VCS (later called the Atari 2600) also grew in popularity with a port of Space Invaders and support from new third-party developer Activision.

Financial performance
 The arcade video game market in the US generates $2.81 billion in revenue ($ adjusted for inflation).
 Home video games sell  ( adjusted for inflation) in the United States, with the Atari VCS leading the market with a 44% share.

Highest-grossing arcade games
The following titles were the highest-grossing arcade games worldwide in 1980.

Japan and United States
In Japan and the United States, the following titles were the highest-grossing arcade video games of 1980.

Best-selling home video games
The following titles were the best-selling home video games in 1980.

Best-selling home systems

Events

Awards
Electronic Games hosts the first Arcade Awards, the first video game awards ceremony. It awards games released during 1978–1979, with Space Invaders winning the overall Game of the Year award.

Business
 New companies: Broderbund, Bug-Byte, HAL Laboratory, Human Engineered Software, Mindscape, On-Line Systems, Sirius, Sir-Tech.
 Mattel creates the original five-programmer Intellivision game design team, later nicknamed the Blue Sky Rangers in 1982 in a TV Guide interview.

Notable releases

Games 
Arcade
 May 22 – Namco releases Pac-Man (originally Puckman in Japan). It becomes the highest-grossing game of all time. It has the first gaming mascot character, established the maze chase genre, opened gaming to female audiences, introduced power-ups, and told a story through cutscenes.
 May – Stratovox from Sun Electronics is the first game with voice synthesis.
 July – Atari, Inc. releases the cold-war-inspired Missile Command.
 October – Nichibutsu releases the vertically scrolling Crazy Climber, the first video game with a climbing mechanic and an objective of climbing to the top of the level.
 November 12 – Stern Electronics releases Berzerk, with designer Alan McNeil's signature on the monitor glass of each cabinet.
 November – Namco releases Rally-X, the first game with a bonus round. It also features multi-directional scrolling.
 November – Universal releases Space Panic, the first game with platforms and ladders. The term platform game was still several years in the future.
 November – Atari, Inc. releases first-person 3D tank shooter Battlezone.
 Cinematronics releases Star Castle. In 1982 the Atari 2600 port ends up as Yars' Revenge.
 Midway's Wizard of Wor is released, allowing two players to fight simultaneously in monster-filled mazes.
 The multi-stage Phoenix sports one of the first video-game bosses: a purple alien in a mothership.

Console
 Atari, Inc.'s port of Space Invaders becomes the killer app for the VCS and the first console title to sell a million copies.
 The first batch of games from Activision, all for the Atari VCS, hits stores: Dragster, Fishing Derby, Boxing, Bridge, and Checkers.

Computer
 December – Infocom releases its first game, Zork (later called Zork I), which begins the Zork series.
 The mainframe game Rogue is written by Michael Toy, Glenn Wichman, and Ken Arnold, eventually spawning a crowded genre of Roguelike games.
 Edu-Ware releases The Prisoner for the Apple II, loosely based upon the 1960s TV series of the same name.
 Strategic Simulations releases its first game: Computer Bismarck for the TRS-80.
 Microsoft publishes Olympic Decathlon for the TRS-80, a track and field video game which precedes Konami's Track & Field and The Activision Decathlon by three years.
 On-Line Systems publishes its first title, the graphic adventure Mystery House for the Apple II.

Handheld
 Nintendo releases the Game & Watch series of LCD handheld electronic games by Gunpei Yokoi.

Hardware
Arcade
 December – Data East releases the DECO Cassette System, the first standardized arcade platform, for which many games are developed.

Console
 Mattel releases the Intellivision home video game console.
 PPZ Ameprod releases the Ameprod TVG-10 dedicated home video game console in Poland.
 The BSS 01 dedicated home video game console is released only in Germany.

Computer
 The Sinclair ZX80 and Acorn Atom are the first home computers to play games in the UK.
 Tandy releases the first version of the Tandy Color Computer.

See also
1980 in games

References

 
Video games
Video games by year